Viribus Unitis (With United Forces) may refer to
SMS Viribus Unitis, an Austro-Hungarian battleship launched in 1911 and sunk in 1918
Pol. Viribus Unitis, an Italian football team
Motto of the house of Habsburg-Lorraine

Latin mottos